Viktor Viktorovich Khorinyak (born March 22, 1990) is a Russian actor. Artist of the after Anton  Chekhov  Moscow Art Theatre. Known for his role as the bartender Konstantin Anisimov in the television series Kitchen. He appeared in about 40 films.

Biography
Khorinyak was born on March 22, 1990 in Minusinsk, Krasnoyarsk Krai, Russian SFSR, Soviet Union (now Russia). He graduated from the Moscow Art Theater School in 2011, after which he took part in a number of performances. In 2007, he made his first film debut.

Acting career
Since 2007, Viktor Khorinyak has been acting in films, since 2010 he began to actively appear in television series. Gained popularity, starring in the role of the bartender  Kostya   Anisimov in the television series Kitchen and the 2014 film The Kitchen in Paris.

Selected filmography

Film

Television

References

External links 
 Viktor Khorinyak on kino-teatr.ru

1990 births
Living people
People from Minusinsk
Russian male film actors
Russian male television actors
Russian male stage actors
21st-century Russian male actors
Moscow Art Theatre School alumni